Raden Saleh is a crater on Mercury. Its name was approved by the IAU in 2008, and it is named after a famous Indonesian painter named Raden Saleh.

Views

References

Impact craters on Mercury